Third World War was an ongoing series featured in the British comic Crisis from 1988 to 1990. Primarily written by Pat Mills and originally illustrated by Carlos Ezquerra, Third World War launched the careers of talents such as Duncan Fegredo and Sean Phillips. 

Third World War  was an overtly political strip set in the near future to comment on current issues. As the strip moved on from developing world topics to minority issues within the UK, Mills took on various co-writers — including Alan Mitchell and Malachy Coney — for episodes dealing with specific situations. One of the characters in Third World War — the pagan warlock eco-terrorist Finn — got his own spin-off series in Crisis' sister comic  2000 AD.

Publication history
Third World War, was the storyline which, along with New Statesmen, launched Crisis, an experiment by editor Steve MacManus and 2000 AD-publisher Fleetway Publications to see if intelligent, mature, politically, and socially aware comics were saleable in the United Kingdom.

Third World War was published in Crisis issues #1 to 53, with the storyline divided into five "Books":
 Book I (Crisis issues dated 17 September 1988 to 18 March 1989)
 Book II (1 April 1989 – 17 February 1990)
 Book III: The Big Heat (17 March 1990 – 7 July 1990)
 Book IV: Ivan's Story (21 July 1990 – October 1990)
 Book V: The Final Problem (October 1990)

Early stories were also repackaged for the American market as a six-issue limited series released in 1990. (This had been part of the business plan for Crisis from the start but only the early series, like Third World War, got this treatment.) 

In 2020 the first storyline was collected into a trade paperback.

Plot
The first storyline extrapolated some of the effects of global capitalism on the developing world into the near future, as seen through the eyes of a group of young conscript "peace volunteer" soldiers. Eve Collins, an unemployed university graduate, is conscripted as a soldier working for a corporation. She discovers how South American countries are exploited by the corporation to produce food at a profit for the rest of the world. In the course of the story, she meets Paul Phillips, a.k.a. Finn.

Alan Mitchell came on as co-writer of Third World War with Book II; Books II and III covered issues including matriarchy, police racism, no-go areas, private police forces, class war, and Black resistance. Malachy Coney also worked on Book II, in "A Symphony of Splintered Wood," concerning "The Troubles" in Northern Ireland.

Episodes

Book I 
Crisis issues dated 17 September 1988 to 18 March 1989.
 "Hamburger Lady" (by Pat Mills with Carlos Ezquerra, in Crisis #1–2, September 1988)
 "Coola Cola Kid" (by Pat Mills with Carlos Ezquerra, in Crisis #3–4, 1988)
 "The Killing Yields" (by Pat Mills with Carlos Ezquerra, in Crisis #5–6, 1988)
 "Blood Money" (by Pat Mills with D'Israeli (part 1) and Angela Kincaid (part 2), in Crisis #7–8, 1988)
 "Danse Macabre" (by Pat Mills with Carlos Ezquerra, in Crisis #9–10, 1989)
 "Made of Maize" (by Pat Mills with Carlos Ezquerra, in Crisis #11–12, 1989)
 "Sell out" (by Pat Mills with Carlos Ezquerra, in Crisis #13–14, March 1989)

Book II 
Crisis issues dated 1 April 1989 to 17 February 1990.
 "Here Be Dragons" (by Pat Mills with co-author Alan Mitchell and art by Angela Kincaid (part 1) and John Hicklenton (part 2), in Crisis #15–16, April 1989)
 "Back in Babylon" (by Pat Mills with co-author Alan Mitchell and art by Carlos Ezquerra, in Crisis #17–18, 1989)
 "Liat's Law" (by Pat Mills with co-author Alan Mitchell and art by Duncan Fegredo, in Crisis #19, 1989)
 "All About Eve" (by Pat Mills with co-author Alan Mitchell and art by Carlos Ezquerra, in Crisis #20–21, 1989)
 "Symphony of Splintered Wood" (by Pat Mills with co-author Malachy Coney and art by Sean Phillips, in Crisis #22–23, 1989)
 "Remembering Zion" (by Pat Mills with co-author Alan Mitchell and art by Sean Phillips, in Crisis #24, 1989)
 "The World According to Ryan" (by Pat Mills with co-author Alan Mitchell and art by John Hicklenton, in Crisis #25, 1989)
 "Liat's Law II" (by Pat Mills with co-author Alan Mitchell and art by Duncan Fegredo, in Crisis #26, 1989)
 "Book of Babylon" (by Pat Mills with co-author Alan Mitchell and art by Sean Phillips, in Crisis #27, 1989)
 "The Dark Other" (by Pat Mills with co-author Alan Mitchell and art by John Hicklenton, in Crisis #29, 1989)
 "The Rhythm of Resistance" (by Pat Mills with co-author Alan Mitchell and art by John Hicklenton, in Crisis #30, 1989)
 "The Calling" (by Pat Mills with co-author Alan Mitchell and art by Sean Phillips, in Crisis #31, 1989)
 "The Man With the Child in His Eyes" (by Pat Mills with co-author Alan Mitchell and art by Sean Phillips, in Crisis #33–34, 1989)
 "Black Man's Burden" (by Pat Mills with co-author Alan Mitchell and art by John Hicklenton, in Crisis #35, 1990)
 "Ivan's Story: Why Me?" part 1 (by Pat Mills with co-author Alan Mitchell and art by Steve Pugh, in Crisis, #36, 1990)
 "Too Late The Hero" (by Pat Mills with co-author Alan Mitchell and art by Robert Blackwell, in Crisis #37, 1990)
 "Epilogue: Baiting the Dragon" (by Pat Mills with co-author Alan Mitchell and art by Richard Piers-Rayner & Tim Perkins, in Crisis #38, 17 February 1990)

Book III: The Big Heat 
Crisis issues dated 17 March 1990 to 7 July 1990.
 "Rebels With a Cause" (by Pat Mills with co-author Alan Mitchell and art by Glyn Dillon, in Crisis #40–41, March 1990)
 "Killing Us Softly" (by Pat Mills with co-author Alan Mitchell and art by Glyn Dillon, in Crisis, #43–44, 1990)
 "Sinergy" (by Pat Mills with co-author Alan Mitchell and art by Robert Blackwell, in Crisis #45–46, 1990)
 "Dollarology" (by Pat Mills with co-author Alan Mitchell and art by Robert Blackwell, in Crisis #47–48, 7 July 1990)

Book IV: Ivan's Story 
Crisis issues dated 21 July 1990 to October 1990.
 "Ivan's Story: Why Me?" parts 2 to 4 (by Pat Mills with co-authors Alan Mitchell and Tony Skinner, and art by Steve Pugh, in Crisis #49–51, July 1990)

Book V: The Final Problem 
Crisis issue dated October 1990.
 "The Final Problem" (by Pat Mills with co-author Alan Mitchell and art by John Hicklenton, in Crisis #53, October 1990)

Collected editions
 Third World War, 6 issues (Fleetway Publications, Sept. 1990–Feb. 1991)
 Third World War, trade paperback (212 pages, Rebellion: Treasury of British Comics, Jan 2020)

Notes

References

Citations

Sources

 1990 limited series
 Rebellion trade paperback

Comics by Pat Mills
Crisis (Fleetway) comic strips
1988 comics debuts
1990 comics endings